Dhone or Dronachalam is a town in Nandyal district of the Indian state of Andhra Pradesh. It is a municipality located in Dhone mandal. And it is the head quarters of Dhone revenue division.

History
Dhone was formerly known as Dronachalam. Dhone is the second biggest municipality in Nandyal district after Nandyal Municipality. According to local tradition, the name of the village is derived from the name of the tutor Dronacharya, a character in Mahabharata, who meditated on the hill in village. There is now a Hanuman temple, Dargah and church on the hill. Dhone has large deposits of high quality limestone, and it was previously the site of an active quarry. The quarry is no longer in operation. The oldest temple in Dhone is Sri Vasavi Temple, which was constructed in 1916. The Vasavi Temple celebrated 100 at the year 2017.

Geography 
Dhone is surrounded by hills on its south. Geographically it is located on Erramala hills.

Demographics 
According to 2011 Census, the Dhone Town has population of 59,272 of which 29,470 are males while 29,802 are females as per report released by Census India 2011.

Population of Children with age of 0-6 is 7118 which is 12.01% of total population of Dhone (Municipality). In Dhone Town, Female Sex Ratio is of 1011 against state average of 993. Moreover, Child Sex Ratio in Dhone is around 954 compared to Andhra Pradesh state average of 939. Literacy rate of Dhone city is 72.33% higher than state average of 67.02%. In Dhone, Male literacy is around 81.88% while female literacy rate is 62.96%.

Economy 
Dhone has large deposits of high quality limestone. It also have good size of Granite and Polish slab Factories. Dhone is Industrially developing town.

Governance

Civic administration 
Dhone is a Municipality in district of Nandyal, Andhra Pradesh. The Dhone city is divided into 32 wards for which elections are held every five years.

The municipality provided 798 public taps, 186 bore-wells, length of  roads, 1551 street lights, a park, public market, elementary and secondary schools etc.

Revenue Division 
Dhone Revenue Division have six mandals:
 Dhone
 Peapully
 Bethamcherla
 Banaganapalle
 Owk
 Koilakuntla.

Politics 
Dhone is represented by Dhone (Assembly constituency) for Andhra Pradesh Legislative Assembly. Buggana Rajendranath Reddy is the present MLA of the constituency representing YSRCP.  Sri Kotla Vijaya Bhaskar Reddy (peddayana) elected as CM for Andhra Pradesh represent Dhone constituency.

Transport

Railways 
Dhone Junction railway station is located in Guntakal railway division of the South Central Railway zone. This junction is one of the oldest railway junctions in  India. Vijayawada - Hubli line and Secunderabad - Bengaluru line meet in the Dhone Junction Railway station.  Dhone railway station is the biggest railway station in Nandyal district.

Roadways 
The Andhra Pradesh State Road Transport Corporation operates bus services from Dhone bus station.  Dhone has bus station situated near National Highway 44, which is called North - South corridor.

Distance to major towns and cities 
 Kurnool = 
 Nandyal = 
 Adoni = 
 Bethamcherla = 
 Banaganapalle = 
 Gooty = 
 Anantapuram = 
 Kadapa = 
 Tirupati = 
 Bellary = 
 Hyderabad = 
 Bengaluru = 
 Vijayawada = 
 Visakhapatnam =

Villages

 Chanugondla

References

External links

Cities and towns in Nandyal district